Ultima is a town in northern Victoria, Australia.

The Ultima Kangaroos are an Australian rules football club which compete in the Golden Rivers Football League. Since joining the then Kerang and District Football League in 1979, the 'Roos have won 10 premierships, which makes them one of the league's most successful teams during that time.

History
Ultima Post Office opened on 27 July 1899.

Today
Golfers play at the course of the Ultima Golf Club on Lake Boga Road.

References

Towns in Victoria (Australia)
Rural City of Swan Hill